Gerlach VI of Isenburg-Limburg (died 1365), also known as Gerlach III of Limburg, was Count of Isenburg-Limburg and Lord of Limburg an der Lahn. He succeeded his father Gerlach V in 1355. In 1356, he married Elisabeth of Falkenstein (died between 1364 and 1366).

In 1365, Gerlach III died in the Black Death without male heirs. With the permission of Pope Urban V, his brother John put aside the office of Canon of Trier Cathedral and took over the rule of Limburg as John II.

References

Sources 
 (Unchanged reprint of the baroque 1720 edition from Verlag Winckler, Wetzlar).
 .

External links 
 History of Limburg Castle
 

House of Isenburg
1365 deaths
Year of birth unknown